The 2012 NCAA Division I Men's Golf Championship was a golf tournament contested from May 29–June 3 at the Riviera Country Club in Pacific Palisades, California. It was the 74th NCAA Division I Men's Golf Championship. The team championship was won by the Texas Longhorns who won their third national championship by defeating the Alabama Crimson Tide in the championship match play round 3–2. The individual national championship was won by Thomas Pieters from the University of Illinois.

Regional qualifying tournaments
Five teams qualified from each of the six regional tournaments held around the country from May 17 to May 19, 2012.

Venue

This was the first NCAA Division I Men's Golf Championship held at the Riviera Country Club in Pacific Palisades, California.

Team competition

Leaderboard
Par, single-round: 284
Par, total: 852

Kent State won the eighth place playoff tie-breaker with Florida State, +2 to +3.
Remaining Teams: Oklahoma (877), Florida (878), North Florida (878), Texas A&M (879), Auburn (880), USC (880), Georgia (881), Chattanooga (884), UCF (885), Stanford (885), Illinois (887), Iowa (888), Virginia (888), Virginia Tech (890), Lamar (892), East Carolina (895), TCU (897), Memphis (901), UAB (902), Tulsa (918)

Match play bracket

Individual competition
Par, single-round: 71
Par, total: 213

References

NCAA Men's Golf Championship
Golf in California
NCAA Division I Men's Golf Championship
NCAA Division I Men's Golf Championships
NCAA Division I Men's Golf Championship
NCAA Division I Men's Golf Championship